The Maryland State Medical Society, commonly known as MedChi, a shortened form of the state medical society's full and ancient historic name: "The Medical and Chirurgical Faculty of the State of Maryland" is the Maryland state-level affiliate of the national body of the American Medical Association, founded in 1799.  It represents the interests of physicians and citizens in the state of Maryland "from unscrupulous and untrained practitioners holding themselves out as health care providers."  "MedChi" has offices in Baltimore and Annapolis, the state capital.

History

MedChi was founded in January 1799, in Annapolis by 101 leaders of the medical profession in Maryland, including Dr. Tobias Watkins and Dr. Ashton Alexander, its first secretary, treasurer, and last surviving charter member.  The physicians who started the organization represented most of Maryland's counties. The Maryland General Assembly approved a petition for a charter for an incorporated society of physicians in Maryland to be known as "The Medical and Chirurgical Faculty of the State of Maryland".  ("Chirurgical" was the common spelling of surgical at the time of the 18th Century.)

The society became the seventh of its kind established in the country. In 1882, Whitfield Winsey was admitted to the Medical and Chirurgical Faculty of Maryland, becoming the first African American to do so.

MedChi is composed of 24 component medical societies, plus international medical graduates, residents, and medical students sections. MedChi's governing body is known as the "House of Delegates" and elects the MedChi president each year.  The president of the Society must be a Maryland physician.

Staff

Current MedChi staff includes:'Gene M. Ransom III - CEO
Shannon P. Pryor, M.D. - president
Debra C. Sciabarrasi - COO
Catherine Johannesen - Chief of Staff

Notable past presidents
 Richard Sprigg Steuart: (president 1848-49, 1850–51), founder of the Maryland Hospital for the Insane, now known as Spring Grove Hospital Center, near Catonsville, Maryland.
 William H. Welch: (president 1891-92), first dean of the Johns Hopkins School of Medicine in Baltimore.
 Sir William Osler: (president 1896-97), first physician-in-chief at the Johns Hopkins Hospital, described as the "Father of Modern Medicine".

Notes

ReferencesMd Med J. 1985 Sep;34(9):900-12. "Supporting Maryland physicians: the Med-Chi staff". Lehman E. The Medical Annals of Maryland. 1799-1899''. Prepared for the centennial of the medical and chirurgical faculty. by William Cordell, Eugene Fauntleroy (1843–1913).

External links
"MedChi" website
Nottingham, England medical and chirurgical society

American Medical Association
1799 establishments in Maryland
Organizations established in 1799